Shekhar is a  Hindu name that may be used as the first or given male name or as the surname.

People

First name
Shekhar Chatterjee (born 1924), Indian actor and director
Shekhar Chaudhuri, Indian management professor
Shekhar Dutt (born 1951), Indian politician
Shekhar Gawli (1975–2020), Indian cricketer
Shekhar Gupta (born 1957), Indian journalist
Shekhar Gurera (born 1965), Indian cartoonist
Shekhar Joshi (born 1939), Indian author
Shekhar Kapur (born 1945), Indian film director, producer and actor
Shekhar C. Mande (born 1962), Indian scientist
Shekhar Mehta (1945–2006), Kenyan rally driver
Shekhar Pathak (born 1949), Indian historian
Shekhar Ravjiani, Indian musician
Shekhar Sen (born 1961), Indian musician and actor
Shekhar Suman (born 1962), Indian actor and television host

Surname
Arjun Shekhar (born 1965), Indian entrepreneur and writer
B. C. Shekhar (1929–2007), Malaysian businessman
Chandra Shekhar Azad (1906–1931), Indian revolutionary
Chandra Shekhar Singh (1927–2007), Indian politician and Prime Minister
Mayank Shekhar (born 1980), Indian journalist
Neeraj Shekhar (born 1968), Indian politician
R. K. Shekhar (1933–1976), Indian composer
Ranjit Shekhar Mooshahary (born 1946), Indian politician
S. Ve. Shekher (born 1950), Indian playwright and actor
Surya Shekhar Ganguly (born 1983), Indian chess grandmaster
Shekhar Khatiwara (born 1994), Bhutanese Electrical Engineer

Other uses
 Shekhar: Ek Jivani, Hindi language novel by Indian writer Agyeya
Simply Shekhar, Indian late-night talk show hosted by Shekhar Suman

See also
Sekar

Indian masculine given names